Ionuț Flavius Curcă (born 7 August 1977) is a Romanian former football goalkeeper. In March 2006, he received the "Sports Merit" Medal, second class, with a bar, from the then President of Romania, Traian Băsescu, because he was part of Rapid's team that qualified for the 2005–06 UEFA Cup quarterfinals.

Honours
Rapid București
Divizia A: 2002–03

References

1977 births
Living people
Romanian footballers
Association football goalkeepers
Liga I players
Liga II players
Liga III players
CS Inter Gaz București players
ASC Daco-Getica București players
FC Rapid București players
CSM Ceahlăul Piatra Neamț players
CSM Jiul Petroșani players
Footballers from Bucharest